Long Buckby Association Football Club is a football club based in Long Buckby, near Northampton, Northamptonshire, England.

History
The club was established in 1937 as Long Buckby Nomads, but reformed under the current name in 1945. They initially played in the Rugby & District League, before becoming founder members of the Northamptonshire Combination in 1953, joining Division One. The club were Division One runners-up in the league's inaugural season. In 1968 they moved up to Division Three of the United Counties League.

Long Buckby were Division Three champions in 1969–70, earning promotion to Division Two. Although they were Division Two champions the following season, the club were not promoted to the Division One due to their ground not meeting the requirements of the league. However, they were Division Two champions again in 1971–72 and were promoted, with Division One renamed the Premier Division the following season; the 1971–72 season had also seen the club win the league's Knock-Out Cup, the Northamptonshire Junior Cup and the Daventry Charity Cup. They were Premier Division runners-up in 1984–85 and won the Knock-Out Cup again the following season. The club were Premier Division runners-up for a second time in 2007–08.

In 2008–09 Long Buckby won the Hillier Cup, beating Brackley Town 2–0 in the final. In July 2009 they won the Maunsell Cup, beating Northampton Town 3–2. The 2011–12 season saw the club win the Premier Division title. However, the club were not promoted as their Station Road ground failed to meet ground grading criteria. They slumped to sixteenth place in the Premier Division the following season, and after finishing bottom of the Premier Division in 2014–15, the club were relegated to Division One. In 2021 they were promoted to back to the Premier Division South based on their results in the abandoned 2019–20 and 2020–21 seasons.

Ground
The club play at Station Road, also known as the Sports Field. They moved to a new pitch on the same site during the 1990s, also building a 200-seat Emms Stand. The ground has a capacity of 1,000.

Honours
United Counties League
Premier Division champions 2011–12
Division Two champions 1970–71, 1971–72
Division Three champions 1969–70
Knock-Out Cup winners 1971–72, 1984–85
Northamptonshire Junior Cup
Winners 1971–72
Hillier Cup
Winners 2008–09
Maunsell Cup
Winners 2009–10

Records
Best FA Cup performance: Third qualifying round, 2011–12
Best FA Vase performance: Fifth round, 2009–10, 2010–11
Record attendance: 750 vs Kettering Town

See also
Long Buckby A.F.C. players
Long Buckby A.F.C. managers

References

External links

 
Football clubs in England
Football clubs in Northamptonshire
1937 establishments in England
Association football clubs established in 1937
Northamptonshire Combination Football League
United Counties League